Tahir Pasha may refer to:

Tahir Pasha Mahmud Bey-zade (fl. 1711–18), Ottoman governor of Dukakin (1717–18)
Tahir Pasha (Egypt) (died c. 29 April 1818), Ottoman governor of Egypt
 Tahir Pasha (Mosul)

See also
 Taher (name)